Bathanthidium is a genus of bees belonging to the family Megachilidae. The species of this genus are found in Southeastern Asia.

Species

Bathanthidium atriceps 
Bathanthidium barkamense 
Bathanthidium bicolor 
Bathanthidium bifoveolatum 
Bathanthidium binghami 
Bathanthidium circinatum 
Bathanthidium concavum 
Bathanthidium emeiense 
Bathanthidium fengkaiense 
Bathanthidium hainanense 
Bathanthidium malaisei 
Bathanthidium moganshanense 
Bathanthidium rubopunctatum 
Bathanthidium sibiricum

References

Megachilidae